Mount Manthe is a mountain  high standing  north-northeast of Shepherd Dome, in the southern part of the Hudson Mountains, Antarctica. It was mapped from air photos taken by U.S. Navy Operation Highjump in 1946–47, and was named by the Advisory Committee on Antarctic Names for Lawrene L. Manthe, a meteorologist at Byrd Station in 1967.

 east stands Inman Nunatak.

See also
 Mountains in Antarctica

References

Hudson Mountains
Mountains of Ellsworth Land
Volcanoes of Ellsworth Land
Miocene stratovolcanoes